Andrew Cant may refer to:

 Andrew Cant (minister) (1590–1663), Presbyterian minister and leader of the Scottish Covenanters
 Andrew Cant (educator) (died 1728), Principal of the University of Edinburgh from 1675 to 1685 and son of the above
 Andrew Cant (bishop) (1649–1730), clergyman of the Scottish Episcopal Church
 Andrew Cant (footballer) (1899–?), Scottish professional footballer